Emamzadeh Ali Akbar or Emamzadeh Aliakbar may refer to:
 Emamzadeh Ali Akbar, Fars
 Emamzadeh Aliakbar, Isfahan
 Emamzadeh Ali Akbar, Semnan